Baeotis  is a butterfly genus in the family Riodinidae. They are resident in the Americas.

Species list 
 Baeotis attali Hall & Willmott, 1998  Ecuador.
 Baeotis bacaenis Hewitson, 1874  Ecuador, Bolivia,  Peru.
 Baeotis bacaenita Schaus, 1902  Peru.
 Baeotis barce Hewitson, 1875 Guyane, Mexico,  Honduras.
 Baeotis capreolus Stichel, 1910  Guyane , Colombia.
 Baeotis cephissa (Hewitson, 1875) Brazil.
 Baeotis choroniensis Lichy, 1946 Venezuela.
 Baeotis creusis Hewitson, 1874 Bolivia,  Peru.
 Baeotis elegantula Hopffer, 1874
 Baeotis euprepes (Bates, 1868)  Guyane,  Bolivia,  Brazil.
 Baeotis felix Hewitson, 1874 Ecuador , Bolivia.
 Baeotis hisbon (Cramer, [1775]) Guyane Brazil.
 Baeotis johannae Sharpe, 1890  Brazil.
 Baeotis kadenii (C. & R. Felder, 1861) Venezuela , Colombia.
 Baeotis melanis Hübner, [1831] Brazil.
 Baeotis nesaea Godman & Salvin, 1889  Panama, Costa Rica,  Ecuador,  Peru.
 Baeotis prima (Bates, 1868)  Guyane,  Brazil
 Baeotis staudingeri D'Abrera, 1994  Peru.
 Baeotis sulphurea (R. Felder, 1869) Mexico,  Venezuela,  Guatemala, Costa Rica,  Ecuador , Colombia.
 Baeotis zonata R. Felder, 1869 Mexico,  Honduras, Guatemala, Ecuador, Colombia.

Sources 
 Baeotis

External links
images representing Baotis at Consortium for the Barcode of Life
images representing Baotis at Encyclopedia of Life

Riodininae
Butterfly genera
Taxa named by Jacob Hübner